Suffolk Football Club is a Northern Irish, intermediate football club playing in Division 1C of the Northern Amateur Football League. The club is based in Belfast, and was formed in 1987. The club plays in the Irish Cup.

References

External links
  Club website]

Association football clubs in Northern Ireland
Association football clubs established in 1987
Association football clubs in Belfast
Northern Amateur Football League clubs
1987 establishments in Northern Ireland